Leonardo Meeus is a Belgian academic who studies Nonmarket Strategy, EU Energy Policy and Energy Economics. He is the Director of the Florence School of Regulation and professor at the European University Institute, Florence, Italy, in the Robert Schuman Centre for Advanced Studies and Director of the Energy Centre at Vlerick Business School in Brussels, Belgium.

Career 
Meeus received his PhD in Electrical Engineering from KU Leuven in 2006. Prior to joining the European University Institute, he was involved in the creation of the first international electricity market in Europe and studied electricity highways working for a project developer in Dublin. 

In addition to his role as Deputy Director of the Florence School of Regulation, Meeus is the Director of the Energy Centre, and professor of Strategy and Corporate Affairs at Vlerick Business School, Brussels, Belgium and has also been a guest professor at KU Leuven. Meeus has provided expertise for EU institutions, regulatory agencies, and companies via research contracts and advisory roles. He is member of the Academic Panel of the Office of Gas and Electricity Markets (since 2017), the energy regulator in the United Kingdom, as well as a member of the International  Association for Energy Economics.

Selected publications 

 Meeus, L., The Evolution of Electricity Markets in Europe, Edward Elgar, 2020
 Schittekatte, T. & Meeus, L., "Least-cost Distribution Network Tariff Design in Theory and Practice", IAEE Energy Journal, 2020, Vol. 41, No. 5 
 Meeus, L. & Glachant, J-M., Electricity Network Regulation in the EU: The Challenges Ahead for Transmission and Distribution, Edward Elgar, 2018
 Saguan, M. & Meeus, L., Impact of the regulatory framework for transmission investments on the cost  of renewable energy in the EU, Energy Economics, 2014, Vol. 43, pp. 185–194
 Meeus, L., Purchała, K., & Belmans, R., Development of the internal electricity market in Europe, Electricity Journal, 2005, Vol. 18, No. 6, pp. 25–35

References 

Electricity economics
Electricity markets
Living people
Academic staff of the European University Institute
KU Leuven alumni
Year of birth missing (living people)
Academic staff of Vlerick Business School